Rudy Kraft III is a game designer who has worked primarily on role-playing games.

Career
Steve Perrin and Rudy Kraft designed the RuneQuest (1978) mythical fantasy roleplaying game, set in the world of Glorantha created by Greg Stafford, and published by Chaosium. Judges Guild's first publication after obtaining the license for RuneQuest was Kraft's Broken Tree Inn (1979), an adventure that featured material cut from Chaosium's own Snake Pipe Hollow (1979), although the Glorantha references were removed in the Judges Guild publication. Kraft and Jennell Jaquays' Adventures Beyond the Pass, originally intended for Judges Guild, was never published by them; Greg Stafford instead published it through Chaosium as Griffin Mountain (1981). Kraft also contributed to Chaosium's Thieves' World (1981). Kraft was one of the contributors to Flying Buffalo's Citybook II: Port O' Call (1984).

Notes

References

External links
 

Chaosium game designers
Living people
Year of birth missing (living people)